Lingo is a television game show that aired in the Netherlands between 1989 and 2014, and returned in 2019 on the commercial channel SBS6. Since 2022, it is aired on the commercial channel Net5. The format consists of a word game that combines Mastermind and Bingo.

From 1989 to 2014, the show was broadcast by public broadcasting associations. From 1989 to 2000 it was broadcast by VARA after which it was broadcast by TROS which later became AVROTROS.

Origins
The original version of the American game show Lingo debuted in syndication in 1987 with Michael Reagan as host and Ralph Andrews as executive producer. Though it ran for only one season, Dutch producers Jan Meulendijks and Harry de Winter were interested in bringing the show to their country.

Eventually, Harry de Winter bought the rights to the show and brought it to the Netherlands in 1989, where it became a massive hit. De Winter later used his earnings from the Lingo series to start his own production company. Later, he devised the format and bought the global rights to the show. International versions subsequently appeared in several other European countries and French-speaking Quebec.

Robert ten Brink was the first host of the show in the Netherlands. He was already well known for hosting the youth news show Het Jeugdjournaal. When Ten Brink eventually decided to leave the show, he was succeeded by François Boulangé, the show's editor. Boulangé thought hosting was not very important, seeing himself as a judge, rather than a host.

Gameplay

Two teams of two contestants each try to guess and spell words, after being given a letter that's in the word and the length of the word. The length of the word that has to be guessed varies from five to eight letters.

Guessing words

Originally, each team had to guess 5-letter words. Later, the game was played with 6-letter words and, on Fridays, 7-letter words. Starting from 2013, games start out with 5-letter words, then progress to 6- and 7-letter words, and finish with a word that contains 8 letters.

The starting team is given the first letter of an unknown word, after which they have a short time to verbally make a guess on the word. The guess must be a valid Dutch word which is spelt correctly, contains the correct number of letters, and begins with the given letter. The guess must then be spelt out. The spelt word, however, does not have to be the same as the word called out as long as the spelling is correct. The players may not confer unless the host says that they may do so.

If the word is spelt correctly within a set time, the word is shown in a 5x5 grid. Letters of the guess that are in the same position as that of the unknown word are shown in red. Letters that appear in the unknown word but are in the wrong position are shown in a yellow circle. Any correct letters which are in the correct position are automatically copied into the next line.

If a player fails to say a word within the time limit or gives an invalid word, the opposing team gets a turn. That team is then shown the next correct letter in the unknown word (unless there is only one space left). This will also happen if a team fails to guess the correct word within five turns. In this sixth turn, the opposing team may now confer.

Unusual words such as verb conjugations (e.g. "speaks") are considered valid words for a team to guess for the sake of giving themselves clues as to the real word but are never the correct answer.

From 1989-2001, correct answers were worth ƒ50. Prior to 2013, each word was worth €25 except for the last word which scored €40. From 2013 on, teams earned €15 for the first three 5-letter words, €25 for the next three 6-letter words, then €40 for the three 7-letter words after that, followed by a final eight-letter puzzle where the teams take it in turns, beginning at €60 and decreasing by €10 after every guess. On the 2019 revival, each word scores €15.

In 2008 a new rule was added: the opposing team may guess the word, even when it is the other teams turn, but they can only do this once per game. If the opposing team is certain they know the word, they can press their button and guess the word. If their guess is incorrect, their score is halved. However, if they are correct, their score is doubled.

Drawing balls

If the word is correctly guessed, the team which guessed the word correctly may draw two balls from the ball basin.  Each team has a Lingo card with 25 numbers on it (odd numbers for one team, even for the other) with some numbers crossed off before the start of the game. Each team's goal is to cross off numbers on the Lingo card by drawing the appropriately numbered ball in order to obtain a horizontal, vertical or diagonal line of five numbers. In that case, the team is said to have achieved a Lingo.

Each team has a ball basin, each with 17 blue numbered balls, 1 blue ball with a question mark, 3 green balls and 3 red balls. The numbers on the balls correspond to the numbers on the Lingo card and are crossed off the card if that ball is drawn. The question mark acts as a wildcard: if this ball is drawn, the team may choose any number from the Lingo card to be crossed off. However, the ball with that number on it remains in the ball basin, and should that ball be subsequently drawn, the team has effectively wasted a turn.

If a green ball is drawn, it is placed above the ball basin and the team may draw another ball. If a team draws all three green balls, they win a jackpot which increases with each correctly guessed word (but doesn't add to a team's score). From 1989-2000, the jackpot increased by ƒ50, and carried over from show to show; after 2001, it starts at €0 and increases by €100 (ƒ500 in 2000) per word but resets to €0 for each show, as well as when it is won.

If a player draws a red ball, their team's turn is over and play continues with the other team. Red balls are discarded after having been drawn so that they do not return to the ball basin.

If a team obtains Lingo, that team receives a bonus and is provided with a new Lingo card with new balls. Green balls carry over to a new Lingo card, but red balls do not. Thus, at the start of a new Lingo card, there will again be three red balls in the ball basin.

From 1989-2000, a Lingo won ƒ100, and the team got a new card. After 2000, Lingoes was worth €100, and the team got a new card. Whichever team has the most money wins.

After obtaining a Lingo, control passes to the other team.

Early Saturday night episodes where 6-letter words were introduced did not use the green balls at all.  Other episodes during Nance's tenure as emcee involved the green balls having numbers of them; this was a tie-in to the Postcode National Lottery, where home viewers won cash and prizes based on what numbers on the green balls were revealed.

On the 2019 revival, instead of drawing numbers, the team drew balls with letters in a scrambled word with 11, 12, or 13 letters. Each drawn letter would be placed in its correct position and guessing their word scored €100.

Ten-letter word
From 2003 to 2006, a new letter would be revealed in a ten-letter word after every turn and the first team to guess the word scored €50. From 2007, every three turns, the teams must try to guess a ten-letter word from a given anagram (using the same color code beginning in 2006) with three letters in place at the start. As time goes on, the letters switch so that more letters are in their correct place. If a team guesses the word within a few seconds, they will receive €70. As time goes by, the amount of money that can be received is reduced by €10 with each letter in the correct place.

The original versions of the 1990s did not use ten-letter words.

Tiebreaker
In the first episodes of Lingo (before the introduction of the National Postcode Lottery), it could occur that the two teams were tied at the end of the game. In that event a tiebreaker was played, the game continued the same as with a regular word, except that turns switched after each guess. Conferring was allowed for the entire word. Guessing the word correctly won the game but was worth no money and teams were not allowed to draw more balls.

Later on in the series, the tiebreaker was replaced by the ten-letter word (played on the same basis as above). Because this word was worth more money than a regular word, ties were no longer possible.

In 2019, the tiebreaker returned to the game. If there is a tie after the last word, a seven-letter word is played in the same way as the last word.

Final round
The team with the highest score after the last round goes to the final. The other team receives, apart from the won money prize, a consolation prize. In the past, the consolation prize has been a Lingo-branded bag. Starting in 2019, the consolation prize is a pair of Lingo socks.

First version
See also No Lingo Bonus Round from the 1987-88 North American version.

In the original version of Lingo transmitted by VARA, the final round was based on the "No Lingo" round in the original 1987 North American version. The team guesses up to five words in this round and must draw numbers from their hopper for every guess they took. This version lasted until 2001.

At the beginning of the finale, the team receives a 25-number Lingo card, and 16 numbers are crossed off. The center space is left uncovered; this number will always make a Lingo when drawn. The hopper is filled with 35 odd- or even-numbered balls and one gold ball.

The finale is played with five words. The team guesses a 5-letter word, as per normal gameplay. For each attempt, the team must draw one ball from the hopper (e.g., if a word is solved in 4 attempts, 4 balls must be drawn). If the word was not guessed, a one-ball penalty was applied; the team had to draw 6 balls. If a numbered ball is drawn that is not on the board, nothing is crossed off and it is discarded. If a numbered ball is drawn that is on the board, it is crossed off, and the ball is discarded as well. If the team draws the gold ball, they stop drawing and their money is automatically doubled. If they manage to draw the required number of balls (or draw the gold ball) without completing a Lingo, the team's money doubles. If at any point in the finale a number is drawn that forms a Lingo on the board, the game ends and the team loses all their winnings. After every word, they can risk their money and play on or stop the game and take their money accrued thus far.

This version of the finale gave rise to the famous sentence, "Staat... niet op de kaart!" ([The number] is... not on the board!) which was always called if a numbered ball was drawn which was not present on the Lingo card.

Second version
This version of the final round was played from 2000 to 2006. An earlier version of this finale was also used before 2000 in Saturday night episodes with 6-letter words. The team must guess seven words correctly within three minutes. If successful, the team wins €5000.

Third version
The third version of the finale is based on the second United States version's final round called "Bonus Lingo".

The team has two and a half minutes to guess as many words as they can, with a five-attempt limit at a word. The contestants must take turns when guessing and cannot confer with each other (unlike the US version) and if they stall for too long, they get buzzed out and lose a turn. For each word guessed correctly within the time limit, they get to draw a numbered ball from the hopper.

After time expires, the team is given a Lingo card with ten numbers (instead of the twelve in the US version) crossed off. One of the balls in the hopper always forms a Lingo when it is drawn (potentially as early as the first pull). The team can then draw the number of balls they won. The hopper starts off with 15 numbered balls. If a team successfully makes a Lingo, they win cash. Unlike in the US version, however, there is no bonus for forming a Lingo on the first ball.

In February 2009, a silver ball was added to the hopper in this round. If it is drawn, the team can choose from two options: they can quit drawing at this point and take home €2,500, or they can decline and continue playing.

Until 2010, the top prize was €5000. From 2010 on, each word added €1000 to the potential prize. In 2012, a pink ball was also added that awards a bonus prize when drawn. As before, drawing the silver ball gives the option of leaving with half the pot.

For the 5000th show in 2013, each word added €5000 to the pot. This endgame was won, for a grand total of €35,640.

On the 2019 revival, making a Lingo wins €5,000. Originally, a gold ball would be mixed in with the numbered balls and would win the team a holiday worth roughly €1,500 if drawn and making a Lingo won €2,500.

Lingo Bingo Show
A special alternative on Lingo which was transmitted on Nederland 1 is the Lingo Bingo Show, presented by Lucille Werner. Here, four teams consisting of Dutch celebrities play against each other.

Similarly to ordinary Lingo, these teams must correctly guess words and then draw balls. The main difference is that the ball barge has five different colors of balls with the characters B, I, N, G, and O written on them in place of numbers. Every team must try to draw one ball of each color and draw so that the word BINGO is formed.  If they draw a blank ball, they lose their turn.  At the same time, the home viewers can win prizes based on the traditional game of bingo.

The final is played between the two best teams. Both teams get 2.5 minutes to correctly guess as many words as possible, and both teams guess the same set of words.  The second team, therefore, is isolated in a soundproof booth while the first team is taking their turn.

In some episodes, François Boulangé acted as judge and word authority, and frequently interacted with host Lucille Werner.

History
The show aired daily starting in 1989 on VARA, one of the Netherlands' public television channels. It was presented by Robert ten Brink and François Boulangé.

In 2000, Lingo was taken over by TROS and serious changes were carried out. The duration of the programme was shortened and the Nationale Postcode Loterij (National Postcode Lottery) started publishing the 'Postcode Lingo' lottery results. By both modifying the play time and significantly reducing the number of words, the points and therefore the prize money that teams could win diminished. The rules of the show had also changed, particularly the final round (as previously discussed). Also, Nance became the new host and Michiel Eijsbouts became the new jury.

With Nance's transition from TROS to SBS in September 2005, a new host took over: Lucille Werner, who had previously hosted Get The Picture and Michiel Eijsbouts (the jury) was replaced by JP (Jan Peter Pellemans). On July 30, 2014, it was announced that Lingo would stop producing new episodes starting in September 2014 due to declining ratings. The final episode aired on October 2, 2014.

The show returned on August 26, 2019 on the commercial channel SBS6 with Jan Versteegh as the new host.

The hosts of the show from pilot to present include:

 Robert ten Brink (1989–1992)
 François Boulangé (1992–2000) (deceased)
 Nance (2000–2005)
 Lucille Werner (2005–2014)
 Jan Versteegh (2019–present)

Jury and voiceover
At each episode of Lingo there is a jury check to see if each called word exists. Since 2000, the jury also did the announcing for the show. The show's jury includes:

 Michiel Eijsbouts (2000–2005)
 Jan Peter Pellemans (JP) (2005–2014, 2019–present)
 François Boulangé (for Lingo Bingo Show)

Until 2000, there were announcers for the introduction of each episode. The names of these announcers are unknown.

Possible moves
In October 2006, leaks from the network coordinator Ton F. van Dijk (a telejournalist for Netherlands 1) revealed that public broadcasting considered ending Lingo in 2007. The programme drew many older viewers, whereas the organizations wanted to draw a younger audience. This caused such a commotion that prime minister Jan Peter Balkenende was even tempted to make official statements about the rumor.

Commercial broadcaster RTL 4 had shown interest in obtaining the rights to the show if they were abandoned by public broadcasting. TROS stated on 17 October that they will keep showing the game, but they wanted to examine how they could adapt the game for a broader public.

On the broadcast of 19 October 2006, Lucille indicated simply that Lingo will continue at TROS. Moreover, this broadcast came after a bet between Robert Jensen and Lucille. This bet implied that she would appear on TV with a deep décolletage. In return, Jensen would participate with Jan Paparazzi on an episode of Lingo. They, however, did not make it to the final.

Charities
Later on (dates are unclear), up to 2009, the Lingo show was coupled with the 'Sponsor Bingo Lottery', a Dutch lottery. In this show, the winning bingo (lottery) numbers were presented by Dutch celebrity Rick Brandsteder. He would also surprise one of the winners with a brand new car.

Other media
Various versions of Lingo were produced for the PC and for consoles such as the Nintendo DS.  The 2000 PC game, however, does not use the green ball rule.

References

External links
Official Website

Bingo
Dutch game shows
1989 Dutch television series debuts
2014 Dutch television series endings
1980s game shows
1990s game shows
2000s game shows
2010s game shows
NPO 1 original programming